The Tundik is a river in the Karkaraly District, Karaganda Region, and Bayanaul and May districts, Pavlodar Region, Kazakhstan.

The river is fed mainly by snow and underground water. It is frozen between November and April. The Tundik waters are used to irrigate the agricultural fields and pastures of the settlements near its banks.

Course 
The Tundik has its sources near Akkora, on the slopes of the Keshubai and Konyrtemirshi mountains of the Kazakh Uplands. It heads roughly northwards, bending northeastwards by Mount Ku. After leaving the mountain to the west it flows northwards again. Shortly before reaching the 51st parallel north the Tundik bends northeastwards. Finally it reaches salt lake Karasor and enters it from the western shore.

Tributaries

See also
List of rivers of Kazakhstan

References

External links

Review of Preliminary Results of Archaelogical Research in the Area of Mount Aiyrtas in 2022, Central Kazakhstan

Rivers of Kazakhstan
Karaganda Region
Pavlodar Region
Endorheic basins of Asia